The Music in My Head is a smooth jazz album released by Michael Franks in 2018. It’s his eighteenth studio album, and the second with the independent Shanachie Records.

Background
The Music in My Head is Franks’ first album after a seven-year hiatus. Franks explained to Parade magazine the album was "written about my own personal spiritual journey" and "[it's] about love, our connection to nature, and the beauty and mystery of it all.”

The album features one of the last recorded guitar solos by Chuck Loeb before his death.

Track listing

Reception
Writing for Smooth-Jazz.de, Hans-Bernd Hülsmann praised the album for "offer[ing] great musical and literary preciousness with charm and elegance. The album contains a marked variety of audible values that demand attention and time from the listener to experience and enjoy all facets."

Justin Kantor highly recommended the album for SoulTracks, saying the album "displays as aptly as ever his ability to convey a breadth of topics in a seamless manner that feels like a choice road trip set to the most mellow—yet colorful—of soundscapes."

On the song "Waterfall", Laura B. Whitmore wrote for Parade that "[it's] a whispery tale of the journey from raindrop to waterfall. With a lilting rhythm, clever lyrics and some melodic guitar and vibes, “Waterfall” is like a sonic sigh of satisfaction."

Personnel
 Michael Franks – vocals
 Eric Marienthal – saxophone
 Gary Meek – saxophone
 Bob Mintzer – saxophone
 Karel Ruzicka – saxophone
 Charles Blenzig – piano
 Gil Goldstein – piano
 Otmaro Ruíz – electric piano (Fender Rhodes), organ (Wurlitzer), synthesizer
 Rachel Z – piano, keyboards
 Larry Koonse – guitar
 David Spinozza – guitar
 Chuck Loeb – guitar, keyboards
 Romero Lubambo – rhythm guitar
 Jay Anderson – double bass
 Sean Conly – double bass
 Jimmy Haslip – bass, synthesizer
 Scott Petito – bass
 Billy Kilson – drums
 Jimmy Branley – drums, percussion
 Rogerio Boccato – percussion
 Manuel Quintana – percussion
 Veronica Nunn – backing vocals
 Leslie Ritter – backing vocals

References

Bibliography

Michael Franks (musician) albums
2018 albums
Shanachie Records albums